The 2009 FIA Alternative Energies Cup was a season of the FIA Alternative Energies Cup, a world championship for vehicles with alternative energy propulsion organized by the Fédération Internationale de l'Automobile. The season consisted of six rallies, beginning with Rally Montecarlo on 29 March, and ended with Green Prix Eco Targa on 9 October.

France's Raymond Durand won the Drivers championship, and Toyota secured their third Manufacturers' title.

Calendar and winners

Driver Standings

Manufacturer Standings

References

FIA E-Rally Regularity Cup seasons
Fia Alternative Energies Cup